Richard Graham may refer to:

Sir Richard Graham, 1st Baronet (1583–1654), English Member of Parliament for Carlisle
Richard Graeme, Anglo-Irish soldier, often known by this spelling
Richard Graham (footballer, born 1974), English football defender, primarily for Oldham Athletic
Richard Graham (footballer, born 1979), footballer from Northern Ireland
Richard Graham (politician) (born 1958), British Conservative Member of Parliament for Gloucester since May 2010
Richard Graham (historian) (born 1934), historian specializing in nineteenth-century Brazil
Richard Graham, 1st Viscount Preston (1648–1695), British politician and diplomat
Richard Alton Graham (1920–2007), founding officer of the National Organization for Women
Richard Graham (rugby union) (born 1972), rugby union coach
Richard Graham (actor) (born 1960), English actor
Richard Robert Graham (1735–1816), apothecary to King George I and George II
Richard Dalziel Graham (died 1920), British educator, author, artist and printer
Richard H. Graham, Evangelical Lutheran bishop
Ricky Graham (born 1946), Australian rules footballer

See also